Joseph Michael Frost (born 14 July 1960) is a British boxer. He competed in the men's welterweight event at the 1980 Summer Olympics.

Early life and amateur career
Frost was born in Liverpool, England, where he still resides to this day. At the age of 10 he started amateur boxing winning 269 out of 287 fights.

ABA Welterweight Championship
At the age of 19 in 1979 he won the ABA Welterweight Championship beating Lloyd Honeyghan in the semi-finals who later became the WBA world champion. In the finals he KO'd Alan Mann in the first round making it last only 15 seconds.

1980 Summer Olympics
In 1980 he competed in the men's welterweight 1980 Summer Olympics defeating Outsana Dao and Peter Talanti but then losing to german boxer Karl-Heinz Krüger in the quarter-finals.

Professional career
Frost turned professional in 1981 with fighting Kevin Walsh winning first round KO marking his first win.

Professional boxing record

References

1960 births
Living people
British male boxers
Olympic boxers of Great Britain
Boxers at the 1980 Summer Olympics
Boxers from Liverpool
Welterweight boxers
20th-century British people
21st-century British people